The following is a list of Wimbledon champions in tennis:

Champions

Senior

Wheelchair

Junior

‡ = a player who won both the junior and senior title.† = a player who won the junior title and reached the senior final.

See also
Lists of champions of specific events
List of Wimbledon gentlemen's singles champions
List of Wimbledon ladies' singles champions
List of Wimbledon gentlemen's doubles champions
List of Wimbledon ladies' doubles champions
List of Wimbledon mixed doubles champions

Other Grand Slam tournament champions
List of Australian Open champions
List of French Open champions
List of US Open champions

References